Erik Johannessen (born 8 August 1984) is a Swedish retired footballer who played as a forward. During his career, he played for clubs such as Örgryte IS, Västra Frölunda IF and Stenungsunds IF.

References

External links
 

1984 births
Living people
Swedish footballers
Örgryte IS players
Ljungskile SK players
Västra Frölunda IF players
Association football forwards
Allsvenskan players
Superettan players